Henrique Araújo de Oliveira, known as Araújo (born 7 August 1998) is a Brazilian football player.

Club career
He made his Ukrainian Premier League debut for Lviv on 28 October 2018 in a game against Dynamo Kyiv.

References

External links
 

1998 births
Sportspeople from Bahia
Living people
Brazilian footballers
Association football forwards
FC Lviv players
Ukrainian Premier League players
Ukrainian First League players
Brazilian expatriate footballers
Expatriate footballers in Ukraine
Brazilian expatriate sportspeople in Ukraine
FC Lokomotíva Košice players
2. Liga (Slovakia) players
Expatriate footballers in Slovakia
Brazilian expatriate sportspeople in Slovakia
FC Mynai players
FC VPK-Ahro Shevchenkivka players